The Air Mail is a 1925 American silent drama film directed by Irvin Willat and starring Warner Baxter, Billie Dove, and Douglas Fairbanks, Jr. It was produced by Famous Players-Lasky and distributed through Paramount Pictures. Filmed in Death Valley National Park and the ghost town of Rhyolite, Nevada, it was released in the United States on March 16, 1925.

Plot
Russ Kane (Warner Baxter) gets a job as a pilot in Reno, Nevada, in order to steal cargo. However, after training he becomes dedicated to his work. After making a forced landing, however, at a "Ghost City" in the desert, he falls in love with Alice Rendon (Billie Dove) and decides to become law-abiding.

When her father (George Irving) needs medicine, he flies to get it, but on the way back is chased by smugglers in other aircraft trafficking narcotics and illegal immigrants across the Mexican border. As a result, "Sandy", Kane's friend (Douglas Fairbanks Jr.), parachutes from Kane's aircraft with the medicine.

Meanwhile, escaped prisoners have invaded Alice's home. All is resolved when a sheriff's posse confronts the invaders and Kane destroys the bandit's aircraft. In the end, Sandy becomes a pilot.

Cast

 Warner Baxter as Russ Kane
 Billie Dove as Alice Rendon
 Mary Brian as Minnie Wade
 Douglas Fairbanks Jr. as "Sandy"
 George Irving as Peter Rendon
 Richard Tucker as Jim Cronin
 Guy Oliver as Bill Wade
 Lee Shumway as "Scotty"
 Jack Byron as Rene Lenoir
 John Webb Dillon as Donald McKee
 Lloyd Whitlock as Speck

Production
Writer Byron Morgan, himself a pilot, strived for authenticity in the story of The Air Mail. To find out what air mail pilots were encountering, Morgan flew on an air mail flight from Reno, Nevada, to San Francisco. The hazards that were found along the route including flying over the Rocky Mountains and inclement weather.

Aircraft used in the film such as the DH .4 and Catron & Fisk arrived from Reno via Tonopah. Stunt pilot Frank Tomlck was hired to do the actual flying in the film, eschewing the use of sound stages or studio effects.

The filming was completed by the end of January. During the filming, Famous Players-Lasky restored the Bottle House, one of the deteriorating buildings in the ghost town.

Reception
Critics deprecated The Air Mail as an "... up-to-date western adventure", virtually ignoring its aviation theme. At the same time, other features based on flying air mail, Trapped in the Sky (1922) and The Fast Mail (1922) were characterized as basically inferior to the Paramount production.

Reviewer Mordaunt Hall, writing for The New York Times in 1925, said that although Dove and Baxter  in The Air Mail, "... deliver creditable performances", the story is "... only mildly interesting and often quite tedious". "This picture ...", he concluded, "... is interesting because of the modern touch to an ordinary Western story, but the idea deserves to be more thoughtful and sincere."

Only one-half (four of eight reels) of a single print of The Air Mail exists today, stored at the Library of Congress in Washington, D.C.

References

Notes

Bibliography

 Beck, Simon D. The Aircraft-Spotter's Film and Television Companion. Jefferson, North Carolina: McFarland and Company, 2016. .
 DuVal, Gary. The Nevada Filmography: Nearly 600 Works Made in the State, 1897 Through 2000. Jefferson, North Carolina: McFarland and Company, 2002. .
 McCoy, Suzy. Rebecca's Walk Through Time: A Rhyolite Story. Lake Grove, Oregon: Western Places, 2004. .
 Paris, Michael. From the Wright Brothers to Top Gun: Aviation, Nationalism, and Popular Cinema. Manchester, UK: Manchester University Press, 1995. .
 Pendo, Stephen. Aviation in the Cinema. Lanham, Maryland: Scarecrow Press, 1985. .
 Wynne, H. Hugh. The Motion Picture Stunt Pilots and Hollywood's Classic Aviation Movies. Missoula, Montana: Pictorial Histories Publishing Co., 1987. .

External links

 
 
 
 Progressive Silent Film List: The Air Mail at silentera.com
 Beautiful lobby poster for the film, rare

American action drama films
American silent feature films
American aviation films
American black-and-white films
Films directed by Irvin Willat
Nevada in fiction
Paramount Pictures films
American women aviators
1920s action drama films
1925 drama films
1925 films
Films shot in Nevada
Films about the illegal drug trade
Films about illegal immigration to the United States
Films set in Reno, Nevada
Films set in Nevada
1920s American films
Silent American drama films
Silent action drama films